Claire Liu (born May 25, 2000) is an American tennis player. On 24th October 2022, she reached her career-high singles ranking of world No. 60.  

In 2017, she was the world No. 1 in the junior rankings, after winning the Wimbledon girls' singles title, and finishing runner-up at the French Open. Liu also won a junior Grand Slam doubles title at Wimbledon with Usue Arconada in 2016. 

As a professional, Liu has won one singles title and one doubles title on the WTA Challenger Tour as well as six singles titles and one doubles title in tournaments of the ITF Women's Circuit.

Personal life
Claire grew up in Thousand Oaks, California. Both her parents are Chinese immigrants.

Junior career
Junior Grand Slam results - Singles:
 Australian Open: -
 French Open: F (2017)
 Wimbledon: W (2017)
 US Open: 2R (2013, 2016)

Junior Grand Slam results - Doubles:
 Australian Open: 
 French Open: QF (2017)
 Wimbledon: W (2016)
 US Open: QF (2016)

Liu won the Junior Wimbledon doubles tournament in 2016 with fellow American Usue Arconada, defeating Mariam Bolkvadze and Caty McNally in the final, in straight sets. The following year, after losing in the Junior French Open final to Whitney Osuigwe, she came back to win the Wimbledon singles title against Ann Li, making her the first American girl to win the event since Chanda Rubin in 1992. With this Grand Slam success, Liu rose to world No. 1 in the girls' junior rankings.

Professional career

2015: Grand Slam debut in qualifying competition
She won her first professional title in March 2015, at an Orlando clay-court tournament on the ITF Women's Circuit. At age 14, Liu was the youngest tennis player to win a professional tournament since Anna Kournikova in 1996.

At the 2015 US Open on her debut, Liu was granted a wildcard into the qualifying tournament. She beat Verónica Cepede Royg and ninth seed Jana Čepelová in her first two matches before losing to the 26th seed, Alexandra Panova, in the final round. Liu, alongside Taylor Fritz, was also given a wildcard for the mixed-doubles event; they were defeated in the first round by the fourth seeds and eventual champions, Martina Hingis and Leander Paes.

2017: Grand Slam debut in singles and doubles
After securing two ITF tournament wins in 2017, Liu was granted again a wildcard into the qualifying for the US Open. She defeated all three of her opponents in the qualifying tournament, earning her a spot in the singles main draw of a Grand Slam championship for the first time. There, she was defeated in the first round, in straight sets by Duan Yingying. 

In their Grand Slam doubles main-draw debut, Liu and Taylor Johnson lost in the first round at the US Open.

2018: First major win
At the 2018 Wimbledon Championships, Liu advanced to the main draw by winning all of her qualifying matches. She lost in the second round to the eventual champion Angelique Kerber. Liu was the only player in the tournament to win a set against Kerber.

2019-2021: Top 100 debut
In October 2019, Liu won her 4th title on the ITF Circuit at a $25k tournament in Florence, South Carolina. 
After finishing as a runner-up in two tournaments in 2020 and another two in 2021, Liu won consecutive tournaments in May 2021 at a $60k tournament in Charlottesville, Virginia and a $100k tournament in Charleston. As a result she reached the top 100 on 23 August 2021.

2022: First WTA tournament final, top 75
In May, she reached her maiden WTA Tour final in Rabat losing to Martina Trevisan who was also a first-time WTA finalist. As a result, she reached the top 75 on 23 May 2022.

Performance timelines

Only main-draw results in WTA Tour, Grand Slam tournaments, Fed Cup/Billie Jean King Cup and Olympic Games are included in win–loss records.

Singles
Current after the 2023 Dubai Open.

Doubles
Current through the 2022 US Open.

WTA career finals

Singles: 1 (runner-up)

WTA Challenger finals

Singles: 1 (1 title)

Doubles: 1 (1 title)

ITF Circuit finals

Singles: 10 (6 titles, 4 runner–ups)

Doubles: 1 (1 title)

Junior Grand Slam finals

Girls' singles: 2 (1 title, 1 runner–up)

Girls' doubles: 1 (title)

Top 10 wins

Notes

References

External links

 
 

2000 births
Living people
American female tennis players
People from Thousand Oaks, California
Tennis people from California
Wimbledon junior champions
Grand Slam (tennis) champions in girls' singles
Grand Slam (tennis) champions in girls' doubles
American sportspeople of Chinese descent
Chinese-American tennis players
Sportspeople from Ventura County, California
21st-century American women